Boerlagella is a genus of flowering plants first described as a genus in 1890.

The genus contains only one known species, Boerlagella spectabilis, endemic to the Island of Sumatra in Indonesia.

References

Sapotoideae
Monotypic Ericales genera
Flora of Sumatra
Sapotaceae genera